Daihiniodes is a genus of sand-treader crickets in the family Rhaphidophoridae. There are at least two described species in Daihiniodes.

Species
These two species belong to the genus Daihiniodes:
 Daihiniodes hastifera (Rehn, 1902) (Arizona sand-treader cricket)
 Daihiniodes larvale Strohecker, 1947 (Stohecker's sand-treader cricket)

References

Further reading

 

Rhaphidophoridae
Articles created by Qbugbot